The Cidra River is a river of Adjuntas, Puerto Rico. Cidra is a tributary to the Río Grande de Arecibo river.

See also
 List of rivers of Puerto Rico

References

External links
 USGS Hydrologic Unit Map – Caribbean Region (1974)
 Ríos de Puerto Rico 

Rivers of Puerto Rico